Collarini is an Italian surname. Notable people with the surname include:

 Andrea Collarini (born 1992), Argentinian-American tennis player
 Olivier Collarini (1863–?), Italian fencer

Italian-language surnames